General Electric Genesis (officially trademarked GENESIS) is a series of passenger diesel locomotives produced by GE Transportation, then a subsidiary of General Electric. Between 1992 and 2001, a total of 321 units were built for Amtrak, Metro-North, and Via Rail.

The Genesis series of locomotives was designed by General Electric in response to a specification published by Amtrak and ultimately selected over a competing design presented by Electro-Motive Diesel (EMD). Until the introduction of the Siemens Charger, the Genesis series had the lowest height of any North American diesel-electric locomotives, being  lower than the previous-generation F40PH. This low height allows the locomotive to travel easily through low-profile tunnels in the Northeast Corridor.

Technical design

The GE Genesis series is unique among recently manufactured North American passenger locomotives in that it uses a single, monocoque carbody design styled by industrial designer Cesar Vergara, thus making it lighter, more aerodynamic, and more fuel efficient than its predecessors (F40PH, F59PH, P30CH, P32-BWH). However, this makes it more costly and time-consuming to maintain and repair. In 2004, Amtrak started installing bolt-on nose cones on its units for easy replacement in the event of a grade crossing collision with a vehicle. As an example of the improvements over the predecessor locomotives, the Genesis is 22% more fuel-efficient than the F40PH while producing 25% more power. In addition, all Genesis locomotives have four-stroke engines instead of the two-stroke engines previously used in EMD counterparts.

The Genesis unit is a fully computerized locomotive which automatically controls all on-board functions, thus producing high reliability while keeping the maintenance requirements low. For example, its computers can automatically reduce the power plant's output in the event that the locomotive is overheating, or suffering from low oil pressure, low water pressure, or reduced airflow into the intakes, thus making it still operable.

The P40DC and P42DC power plants can supply 60-hertz head-end power either from the HEP alternator with the engine speed-locked to 900 rpm (normal mode) or from the traction alternator with the engine speed-locked to 720 rpm (standby mode). In the latter case, traction power is unavailable. The P32AC-DM powerplant does not have to be locked at a certain rpm because it utilizes an HEP inverter, which allows the prime mover to run at 1047 rpm when providing both traction power and HEP, and to idle at 620 rpm (or notch three) while still providing HEP for lighting and air-conditioning when not providing traction power.

The trucks of Genesis locomotives were made by Krupp Verkehrstechnik, which has since been absorbed by Siemens Mobility; the trucks on the newest Genesis locomotives carry the Siemens name.

Models
Three models of Genesis were built by General Electric, the P40DC, P42DC, and P32AC-DM.

P40DC

The P40DC (GENESIS Series I) or Dash 8-40BP (originally known as the AMD-103 or Amtrak Monocoque Diesel - 103MPH) is the first model in the Genesis series, built in 1993. The locomotive operates in a diesel-electric configuration that uses DC to power the traction motors, producing  at 1047 rpm. Power output to the traction motors is  when running in HEP mode (900 rpm) with a 0 kW HEP load. Traction power in HEP mode decreases to a bare minimum of  when providing the maximum  HEP load to the train. The P40DC was succeeded in 1996 by the P42DC.

A feature unique to the P40DC and P32AC-DM is a hostler stand at the rear of the locomotive providing increased visibility and reversing capabilities to the engineer while conducting reverse operations. Another unique feature to the original P40DC were the two strobes above the cab and an emergency flasher between the strobes. When they were overhauled, those features were removed.

Both the P40DC and P42DC allowed Amtrak to operate heavy long-distance trains with fewer locomotives compared to the older EMD F40PH locomotives; two P40DCs could do the same work as three F40PHs. Additional deliveries of the P42DC ended up replacing the P40DCs. Three units were wrecked (819 in the 1993 Big Bayou Canot train wreck and 807 and 829 in the 1999 Bourbonnais, Illinois, train crash) and scrapped. Eight were leased and later sold to the Connecticut DOT for Shore Line East in 2005, and four were rebuilt and sold to New Jersey Transit in 2007; NJ Transit sold their units to ConnDOT in 2015. The remaining 29 units were placed out-of-service for many years. 15 of these units have been rebuilt using 2009 ARRA stimulus funds and returned to service, now in the Phase V livery, except for 822, which is painted in Phase III Heritage livery for Amtrak's 40th Anniversary. The units that were not rebuilt or sold have since been disposed.

In January 2018, ConnDOT awarded a contract to Amtrak to overhaul their twelve P40DC locomotives at the Beech Grove Shops. The first unit was completed in early 2021.

Upgraded and "Stimulus" P40DCs

This was done by readjusting the position of the lay shafts within the prime mover.

Amtrak has returned 15 of their P40DC units to service as part of a project funded through the American Recovery and Reinvestment Act of 2009. The first of the units were returned to service in March 2010 after being overhauled at the Beech Grove Shops. They also received updated cab signaling systems. The upgraded locomotives still have mechanical air brakes, which makes them most suitable for trains that only require a single locomotive. This differs from the electronic air brakes on the P42DC and P32AC-DM. They also feature a builder's plate indicating that they were rebuilt under the auspices of the TIGER stimulus program.

P42DC

The P42DC (GENESIS Series I) is the successor model to the P40DC. Traction power in HEP mode decreases to a bare minimum of   when providing the full 800 kW HEP load to the train.

P42DCs are used primarily on most of Amtrak's long-haul and higher-speed rail service outside the Northeast and lower Empire Corridors. They will be replaced on long-distance service by 125 Siemens ALC-42 Charger locomotives between 2021 and 2024, but will remain in service on corridor trains.

Via Rail Canada has utilized P42DC locomotives since 2001, when they replaced the LRC locomotives in 2001.

P32AC-DM

The P32AC-DM (GENESIS Series II, short for "Passenger, Alternating Current, Dual Mode") was developed for both Amtrak and Metro-North. They can operate on power generated either by the on-board diesel prime mover or power collected from a third rail electrification system at 750 volts direct current; the third-rail shoes are used on the over-running third-rail into Penn Station for Amtrak units and the under-running third-rail into Grand Central Terminal for Metro-North.

The P32AC-DM is unique as it is equipped with GE's GEB15 AC (alternating current) traction motors, rather than DC (direct current) motors as used in the other subtypes. It is also only one of two modern American electro-diesel locomotives with third-rail capability, along with the EMD DM30AC operated by the Long Island Rail Road. NJ Transit and Exo's Bombardier ALP-45DP electro-diesel locomotive can operate from overhead catenary electrification.

The P32AC-DM is only used on services operating north from New York City, where diesel emissions through its two fully enclosed main terminal stations are prohibited. Amtrak rosters 18 P32AC-DM locomotives and uses them for its Empire Service, Ethan Allen Express, Lake Shore Limited (New York section), Adirondack, and Maple Leaf services, all which travel to New York Penn Station. Metro-North rosters 31 P32AC-DM locomotives on push-pull trains to Grand Central Terminal; four are owned by the Connecticut Department of Transportation.

In December 2020, the Metropolitan Transportation Authority of New York board approved a Federal Transit Administration-funded $335 million contract for 27 dual-mode locomotives, based on the Siemens Charger design. The new dual mode locomotives will replace the 27 existing P32AC-DM locomotives used on Metro-North's Hudson Line, Harlem Line, and Danbury Branch; they will use third rail electric power to enter Grand Central Terminal. The order includes additional options for up to 144 more locomotives, which includes 32 additional for use by Metro-North, 20 for the New York State Department of Transportation (for Amtrak Empire Service trains), and 20 for the Connecticut Department of Transportation.

Original owners

See also
 List of Amtrak rolling stock
 EMD F40PH

References 

B-B locomotives
Amtrak locomotives
P32AC-DM
Metro-North Railroad
Via Rail locomotives
NJ Transit Rail Operations
Genesis
Passenger locomotives
Diesel-electric locomotives of the United States
Railway locomotives introduced in 1992
Standard gauge locomotives of the United States
Bo-Bo locomotives
Standard gauge locomotives of Canada